Harry Bedford may refer to:
*Harry Bedford (rugby) (1866–1929), rugby union footballer of the 1880s and 1890s for England and Batley
Harry Bedford (music hall) (1873–1939), English music hall entertainer
Harry Bedford (politician) (1877–1918), New Zealand politician
Harry Bedford (footballer) (1899–1976), English footballer
Harry Bedford (cricketer) (1907–1968), English cricketer

See also 
Henry Bedford (disambiguation)